Turkey meat, commonly referred to as just turkey, is the meat from turkeys, typically domesticated turkeys but also wild turkeys. It is a popular poultry dish, especially in North America and the United Kingdom, where it is traditionally consumed as part of culturally significant events such as Thanksgiving and Christmas respectively, as well as in standard cuisine.

Preparation and production

Turkeys are sold sliced and ground, as well as "whole" in a manner similar to  chicken with the head, feet, and feathers removed. Turkey "crowns" are the breast of the bird with its legs and wings removed. Frozen whole turkeys remain popular. Sliced turkey is frequently used as a sandwich meat or served as cold cuts; in some cases where recipes call for chicken, it can be used as a substitute. Ground turkey is sold, and frequently marketed as a healthy alternative to ground beef. Without careful preparation, cooked turkey is usually considered to end up less moist than other poultry meats such as chicken or duck.

Wild turkeys, while technically the same species as domesticated turkeys, have a very different taste from farm-raised turkeys. Almost all of the meat is "dark" (including the breast) with a more intense flavor. The flavor can also vary seasonally with changes in available forage, often leaving wild turkey meat with a gamier flavor in late summer, due to the greater number of insects in its diet over the preceding months. Wild turkey that has fed predominantly on grass and grain has a milder flavor. Older heritage breeds also differ in flavor. Traditionally raised English turkey meat has been granted the EU and UK designation Traditional Speciality Guaranteed under the name Traditional Farmfresh Turkey.

A large amount of turkey meat is processed. It can be smoked, and as such, is sometimes sold as turkey ham or turkey bacon, which is considered to be far healthier than pork bacon. Twisted helices of deep-fried turkey meat, sold as "turkey twizzlers", came to prominence in the UK in 2004, when chef Jamie Oliver campaigned to have them and similar foods removed from school dinners.

Unlike chicken eggs, turkey eggs are not commonly sold as food due to the high demand for whole turkeys and lower output of eggs as compared with other fowl (not only chickens, but even ducks or quail). The value of a single turkey egg is estimated to be about $3.50 on the open market, substantially more than an entire carton of one dozen chicken eggs.

Cultural traditions

Turkeys are traditionally eaten as the main course of Thanksgiving dinner feasts in the United States and Canada, and at Christmas dinner feasts in much of the rest of the world (often as stuffed turkey).

Turkey meat has been eaten by indigenous peoples from Mexico, Central America, and the southern tier of the United States since antiquity.  In the 15th century, Spanish conquistadores took Aztec turkeys back to Europe.

Turkey was eaten in as early as the 16th century in England. Before the 20th century, pork ribs were the most common food for the North American holidays, as the animals were usually slaughtered in November. Turkeys were once so abundant in the wild that they were eaten throughout the year, the food considered commonplace, whereas pork ribs were rarely available outside of the Thanksgiving–New Year season. While the tradition of turkey at Christmas spread throughout Britain in the 17th century, among the working classes, it became common to serve goose, which remained the predominant roast until the Victorian era.

Turkey with mole is regarded as Mexico's "national dish".

Turkey rice is regarded as one of Taiwan's national dishes

Cooking

Turkeys are usually baked or roasted in an oven for several hours, often while the cook prepares the remainder of the meal. Sometimes, a turkey is brined before roasting to enhance flavor and moisture content. This is done because the dark meat requires a higher temperature to denature all of the myoglobin pigment than the white meat (very low in myoglobin), so that fully cooking the dark meat tends to dry out the breast. Brining makes it possible to fully cook the dark meat without drying the breast meat. Turkeys are sometimes decorated with turkey frills, paper frills or "booties" that are placed on the end of drumsticks or bones of other cutlets.

In some areas, particularly the American South, they may also be deep fried in hot oil (often peanut oil) for 30 to 45 minutes by using a turkey fryer. Deep frying turkey has become something of a fad, with hazardous consequences for those unprepared to safely handle the large quantities of hot oil required.

Nutrition
When raw, turkey breast meat is 74% water, 25% protein, 1% fat, and contains no carbohydrates (table). In a  reference amount, turkey breast supplies  of food energy, and contains high amounts (20% or more of the Daily Value, DV) of protein, niacin, vitamin B6, and phosphorus, with moderate content (10–19% DV) of pantothenic acid and zinc.

A 100 gram amount of turkey breast contains 279 mg of tryptophan, a low content compared to other amino acids in turkey breast meat. There is no scientific evidence that this amount of tryptophan from turkey causes post-meal drowsiness.

Accompaniments

For Thanksgiving in the United States, turkey is traditionally served stuffed or with dressing (on the side), with cranberry sauce and gravy. Common complementary dishes include mashed potatoes, corn on the cob, green beans, squash, and sweet potatoes. Pie is the usual dessert, especially those made from pumpkins, apples, or pecans. It can also be eaten at Christmas in the United States and North America.

For Christmas in the United Kingdom, turkey is traditionally served with winter vegetables, including roast potatoes, Brussels sprouts, and parsnips. Cranberry sauce is the traditional condiment in the northern rural areas of the United Kingdom where wild cranberries grow. In the south and in urban areas, where cranberries until recently were difficult to obtain, bread sauce was used in its place, but the availability of commercial cranberry sauce has seen a rise in its popularity in these areas, too. Pigs in blankets, a dish consisting of small sausages (usually chipolatas) wrapped in bacon are a popular and traditional accompaniment.

Especially during holiday seasons around Thanksgiving and Christmas, stuffing or dressing is traditionally served with turkey. The many varieties include oatmeal, chestnut, sage and onion (flavored bread), cornbread, and sausage are the most traditional. Stuffing is used to stuff the turkey (as the name implies) or may be cooked separately and served as a side dish (dressing).

See also
 List of turkey meat producing companies in the United States
 List of stuffed dishes

References

External links 
 

American cuisine
Canadian cuisine
Christmas food
Native American cuisine
Poultry products
Stuffed dishes
Thanksgiving food
Meleagris
Types of food